I Am Curious... may refer to:

In film:
I Am Curious (Yellow), the 1967 film
I Am Curious (Blue), the 1968 film
I Am Curious Onion, a 1990 film by Paul Yates

In television:
"I Am Curious Cooper", an episode of The Mary Tyler Moore Show
"I Am Curious... Maddie", an episode of Moonlighting
"I Am Curious, Melrose", an episode of Melrose Place
"I Am Curious Ed", an episode of Ed, Edd n Eddy

In music:
 "I Am Curious", a song from White Heat (Dusty Springfield album)
 I Am Kurious Oranj, an album by The Fall

In other uses:
I Am Curious, Black, a comedy album by Redd Foxx
 The Superman's Girl Friend, Lois Lane issue "I Am Curious (Black)" wherein Lois Lane becomes a Black woman for a day to experience racism.

See also
I Am Curious Partridge (disambiguation)